SDB-005 is an indazole-based synthetic cannabinoid that has been sold online as a designer drug. It is presumed to be an agonist of the CB1 and CB2 cannabinoid receptors. SDB-005 is the indazole core analog of PB-22 where the 8-hydroxyquinoline has also been replaced with a naphthalene group.

The code number SDB-005 was originally used for a different compound, the N-phenyl instead of N-benzyl analogue of SDB-006. This compound is a potent agonist of the CB1 receptor (Ki = 21 nM) and CB2 receptor (Ki = 140 nM).

However, SDB-005 was subsequently used as the name for the indazole-3-carboxylate compound mentioned above when it was sold in Europe as a designer drug, and was entered into the EMCDDA synthetic drug database under this name. Consequently, there are now two distinct, yet fairly closely related cannabinoid compounds, which may both be referred to under the code SDB-005.

See also 
 5F-PB-22
 AM-2201
 BB-22
 JWH-018
 NM-2201
 NNE1

References 

Indazoles
Cannabinoids
Designer drugs